The men's tournament of rugby sevens at the 2018 Asian Games at Jakarta, Indonesia, was started on 30 August and ended on 1 September 2018. Games were held at the Gelora Bung Karno Rugby Field.

Squads

Results
All times are Western Indonesia Time (UTC+07:00)

Preliminary round

Group A

Group B

Group C

Summary

Ranking round 9–12

Final round

Quarterfinals

Semifinals 5th–8th

Semifinals

Classification 7th–8th

Classification 5th–6th

Bronze medal match

Gold medal match

Final standing

References

External links
 Rugby sevens at the 2018 Asian Games

Men sevens